A list of films produced by the Bengali language film industry based in Kolkata in the year 1931.

A-Z of films

Gallery

Notes

References
 Bengali Film Directory – edited by Ansu Sur, Nandan, Calcutta, 1999

External links
 Tollywood films of 1931 at the Internet Movie Database
Tollywood films of 1931 at gomolo.in

1931
Lists of 1931 films by country or language
Films, Bengali